ENIAC Day or the World’s First Computer Day is celebrated on February 15.
 
On February 10, 2011, the City of Philadelphia officially declared that February 15, 2011 - the 65th anniversary of the unveiling of the Electronic Numerical Integrator and Computer (ENIAC), the world's first general-purpose electronic computer, developed at the University of Pennsylvania's Moore School of Electrical Engineering - would that year and henceforth be known as ENIAC Day.

References

Computers